Xiao-gang station, known as Jiangxia station  during planning, is a metro station on Line 2 of the Guangzhou Metro. It is located underground to the south of Huangshi Road East, the east of Yuncheng Road West and the south of Xiaogang River, in the Baiyun District of Guangzhou. It started operation on 25September 2010.

Xiao-gang station is within walking distance of the Guangdong University of Foreign Studies north campus, as well as the west gate of Baiyun Mountain.

The English station name is hyphenated to avoid confusion with the similarly named Xiaogang station on Line 8, which shares the same pinyin spelling but has a different tonal pronunciation and different characters.

References

Railway stations in China opened in 2010
Guangzhou Metro stations in Baiyun District